Bugs Bunny's Christmas Carol is an eight-minute animated short film produced by Warner Bros. Television and DePatie–Freleng Enterprises and released in 1979 by Warner Bros. as part of the Christmas special, Bugs Bunny's Looney Christmas Tales.

The cartoon is an adaptation of the Charles Dickens 1843 classic novella A Christmas Carol, featuring Yosemite Sam as Ebenezer Scrooge and Porky Pig as Bob Cratchit. Bugs Bunny plays Jacob Marley and Fred. Scrooge's dream-journey into his past, present, and future is omitted; instead, Bugs dresses up as a white-robed emissary of Hades to scare Scrooge straight.

Plot 
Scrooge (played by Yosemite Sam) is counting money in the counting house of his firm when Bob Cratchit (Porky) comes in, wanting to borrow a lump of coal as he is freezing. Scrooge refuses ("I gave you one last Tuesday," he says; "You should've made it last.") and tells him to just work faster so he'll keep warm. Then Scrooge's nephew Fred (Bugs) comes in with Christmas decorations and mistletoe. He is tossed out, and decides that "somebody oughta teach that little humbug some Christmas spirit". Fred then borrows a piece of coal and places it in the office of Cratchit, who graciously thanks him.

However, Scrooge's cat Sylvester notices this and warns him. Scrooge takes back the coal, throwing him out along with carolers (Elmer Fudd, Pepé Le Pew and Foghorn Leghorn) whom Fred let into the office, and fires Cratchit. Cratchit invites Fred to dinner and introduces him to his youngest son Tiny Tim (Tweety Bird). "Kinda puny, isn't he?" Bugs notes. "If you had to live on birdseed, you'd be puny too!" Tim retorts. Scrooge sends the light company to take the last candle (as Cratchit is past due) and a notice that the house is being foreclosed, forcing Cratchit to move out by midnight. Fred decides this is the last straw, remarking Bugs's catchphrase "Of course, you realize that this means war."

First, Fred annoys Scrooge with more carolers. When Scrooge goes out to deal with this, he slips into a pile of snow. Next, he puts snow into Scrooge's hot bath, turning it ice-cold as Scrooge jumps in. Fred then dresses up as a ghost - specifically, Scrooge's late business partner Jacob Marley. As Marley, he drags around chains and beats a drum. Investigating, Scrooge accidentally slips down the stairs and into the cold along with Sylvester. When they return to bed, Marley reappears. Sylvester promptly flees, slamming the door behind him and cutting off Scrooge. Marley threatens to take Scrooge to see "the man in the red suit" (the Devil, though Scrooge first guesses Santa Claus).

Scrooge promptly changes his ways for the better. To prove himself reformed, he dresses up as Santa Claus and runs through the streets at night - giving money to the poor, widows, orphans, and the like. He also rehires Bob Cratchit by making his new partner in the firm, succeeding Marley. Tweety raises a toast to him, and Fred kisses him. Scrooge (now going by the name of Sam) still hates kissing, though.

This story is the first part of Bugs Bunny's Looney Christmas Tales. As the second one featuring Wile E. Coyote and Roadrunner (Freeze Frame) begins, Bugs congratulates Sam for making Scrooge a charitable character, but Sam tells Bugs that it was all a play, and demands Porky and the gang give all his money back to him.

See also 
 List of A Christmas Carol adaptations
 List of Christmas films
 List of Yosemite Sam cartoons
 List of Bugs Bunny cartoons
 List of Porky Pig cartoons
 List of cartoons featuring Sylvester

References

External links 
 

1979 television films
1979 films
1979 animated films
1979 short films
1970s animated short films
1970s Warner Bros. animated short films
American Christmas films
Animated Christmas films
Films based on A Christmas Carol
Television shows based on A Christmas Carol
Ghosts in television
Looney Tunes shorts
American television films
1970s American animated films
Animated films based on novels
Bugs Bunny films
Films directed by Friz Freleng
Yosemite Sam films